was a town located in Esashi District, Sōya Subprefecture, Hokkaido, Japan.

As of 2004, the town had an estimated population of 2,332 and a density of 3.84 persons per km2. The total area was 606.51 km2.

On March 20, 2006, Utanobori was merged into the expanded town of Esashi.

Climate

References

External links
Esashi official website 

Dissolved municipalities of Hokkaido
Esashi, Hokkaido (Sōya)